Timothy "Tim" Dolensky (born July 18, 1992) is an American former figure skater. He is the 2012 U.S. junior silver medalist and placed 12th at the 2012 World Junior Championships.

Early life and education
Timothy Dolensky was born July 18, 1992, in Birmingham, Alabama. He studied at Kennesaw State University, majoring in exercise and health science.

Career

Early years
Dolensky began skating at age six after a school trip to an ice rink. He competed nationally on the juvenile level in the 2004–05 season and on the intermediate level the following season. He moved up to the novice level in the 2007–08 season and won the bronze medal at the 2010 U.S. Championships.

Junior career
In the 2010−11 season, Dolensky was assigned to his first ISU Junior Grand Prix (JGP) competition, in Sheffield, England, and finished 4th at the event.

Dolensky composed his own music, Windfall, for his 2011−12 short program. He competed at two JGP events, winning bronze in Riga, Latvia and placing 4th in Innsbruck, Austria. He was awarded the silver medal in the junior event at the 2012 U.S. Championships and was sent to the 2012 World Junior Championships. Dolensky finished 12th overall at the event in Minsk, Belarus, having ranked 9th in the short program and 13th in the free skate.

Senior career
Dolensky placed fourth in his senior international debut at the 2012 U.S. Classic.

He composed his 2014–15 short program music, Bella Luce. In October, he finished fourth at the 2014 Skate Canada Autumn Classic, his first ISU Challenger Series event. He sustained a concussion on November 12, 2014, as a result of a collision with another skater in Kennesaw, Georgia.

Competing in the 2015–16 ISU Challenger Series, Dolensky placed fourth at both the 2015 U.S. International Classic and at the 2015 Finlandia Trophy. He appeared at the 2015 Skate Canada International as a replacement for the injured Joshua Farris. Making his Grand Prix debut, he placed 11th in the short program, 6th in the free skate, and 7th overall. He also finished 7th at the 2016 U.S. Championships.

Dolensky placed 8th at the 2016 Skate America and 7th at the 2017 U.S. Championships.

In the 2017–18 season, Dolensky placed 6th at the 2017 CS U.S. International Classic.
and 7th at the 2018 U.S. Championships.

He finished 6th at the 2019 U.S. Championships and announced that he would be stepping away from competitive figure skating on April 17th, 2019.

He now skates professionally for Disney on Ice: Mickey's Search Party and is married to professional figure skater Sarah Dalton.

Personal life
Dolensky plays the violin and piano.

Programs

Competitive highlights 
GP: Grand Prix; CS: Challenger Series; JGP: Junior Grand Prix

Detailed results 
Small medals for short and free programs awarded only at ISU Championships.

References

External links 

 
 Timothy Dolensky at IceNetwork.com

American male single skaters
1992 births
Living people
People from Kennesaw, Georgia
Sportspeople from Cobb County, Georgia